Rossana Di Lorenzo (4 March 1938 – 13 August 2022) was an Italian film actress.

Life and career 

Born in Rome, the sister of actor Maurizio Arena, she debuted in a main role in 1970, playing Alberto Sordi's wife in a segment of the anthology film Le coppie. In 1976 she reprised the role in a segment of the Sordi's comedy film Il comune senso del pudore. Active for about twenty-five years, her works include films by Ettore Scola, Vittorio Gassman, Mauro Bolognini, Luigi Zampa and Carlo Vanzina. In 1983 she was nominated for the David di Donatello for Best Supporting Actress for her performance in Scola's Le Bal.

Selected filmography 

  Le coppie (1970)
  Without Family (1972)
  To Love Ophelia (1974)
  Claretta and Ben (1974)
  Africa Express (1976)
  Il comune senso del pudore (1976)
  The Inheritance (1976)
  Taxi Girl (1977)
  Le Bal (1983)
  Vacanze di Natale (1983)
  Amarsi un po' (1984)
  Cuori nella tormenta (1984)
  S.P.Q.R.: 2,000 and a Half Years Ago (1994)

References

External links 

 

1938 births
2022 deaths
Actresses from Rome
Italian film actresses
20th-century Italian actresses